Between the Wars is the thirteenth studio album by Al Stewart, recorded with Laurence Juber. Its major theme is the period "between the wars", from 1918 to 1939. When released it was a critical success but a commercial failure.

Track listing
"Night Train to Munich" – 4:25
"The Age of Rhythm" – 4:00
"Sampan" – 3:37
"Lindy Comes to Town" – 4:24
"Three Mules" – 5:37
"A League of Notions" – 4:17
"Life Between the Wars" – 2:47
"Betty Boop's Birthday" – 2:05
"Marion the Chatelaine" – 3:41
"Joe the Georgian" – 3:31
"Always the Cause" – 3:18
"Laughing Into 1939" – 4:15
"The Black Danube" – 2:47

The 2007 Collector's Choice re-release has the following additional tracks:

"The Bear Farmers Of Birnam" - 3:29
"Merry Monks" - 1:35

Historical references

"Night Train to Munich": a 1940 film directed by Carol Reed and starring Rex Harrison bears the same title as this song.
"Lindy Comes to Town": the titular figure is Charles Lindbergh, who "comes to town" in a June 13, 1927 "ticker-tape parade". US President Calvin Coolidge is referred to, and the Wall Street Crash of 1929 is ironically hinted at.
"Three Mules": tells of British Prime Ministers Ramsay MacDonald, Stanley Baldwin and Neville Chamberlain who did little to prepare Britain for war and downplayed the threat Hitler posed to peace.
"A League of Notions": the title plays on and refers to the formation and earliest acts of the League of Nations at the 1919 Paris Peace Conference in Versailles. Several historical figures are mentioned, including US President Woodrow Wilson, British Prime Lloyd George, French Prime Minister Georges Clemenceau and T. E. Lawrence (here referred to as "Lawrence of Arabia"). The lyrics bemoan the difficulties of establishing new territorial boundaries for Russia, Germany, Poland, Yugoslavia, Czechoslovakia, Turkey, Persia and Iraq. Churchill's hiccup is mentioned, as are Wilson's Fourteen Points and Clemenceau's historical remark to Lloyd George that "God Himself had only ten."q:Georges Clemenceau
"Marion the Chatelaine": refers to Marion Davies, the mistress of American newspaper baron William Randolph Hearst.
"Betty Boop's Birthday": an instrumental. Betty Boop was a cartoon character popular in the 1930s; in 1933, she appeared in the short film Betty Boop's Birthday Party.
"Joe the Georgian": Tells of Soviet officers waiting in Hell for Joseph Stalin, the titular Georgian, to arrive. "We're sharpening our pitchforks/And we're heating up the ends," the narrator declares, adding that he hopes Stalin "likes the next few million years." The second verse invokes the metaphor of a literal "ship of state", referring to Vladimir Lenin as "the captain" who became sick, whereupon Stalin, the "mate", took over. Soviet historical figures Lev Kamenev, Grigory Zinoviev and Nikolai Bukharin are described as already being in amongst those waiting in the "anteroom to Hell".
"Always the Cause": about the Spanish Civil War. Dolores Ibarruri, "La Pasionara", is mentioned, as is her slogan ¡No pasarán!. The narrator declares that "Tonight I saw Guernica burn."
"The Black Danube": an instrumental. The Danube River originates in Germany's Black Forest.

Musicians
Al Stewart – vocal, guitar, woodblock, synth strings
Laurence Juber – guitars, banjo, six string bass, dobro, mandolin, synth strings
Bobby Bruce – violin
Tim Landers – acoustic bass guitar
Sam Riney – clarinet, soprano sax
Guy Babylon – synth strings, tack piano
Steve Forman – percussion
Suzoe Katayama – cello, accordion
Domenic Genova – arco bass
Herman Beeftink – piano, synth strings
James Hutchinson (musician) – bass
Jim Keltner – drums
Robin Lamble – backing vocals
Andrew Powell – synth strings
Richard Evans - Sleeve Design

Notes

1995 albums
Al Stewart albums